Bill Garrard (May 10, 1940 – November 28, 2022) was a Republican politician who served as state representative for District 56 of the Oregon House of Representatives from 2001 to 2013. His district represents the voters in southern Klamath County, including Klamath Falls.

Electoral history

External links 
 Legislative website
 Congress.org profile

1940 births
Living people
Republican Party members of the Oregon House of Representatives
Politicians from Klamath Falls, Oregon
Politicians from Rochester, New York
21st-century American politicians